William David Delahunt (born July 18, 1941) is an American lawyer and politician from Massachusetts. He is a member of the Democratic Party. Delahunt did not seek re-election in 2010, and left Congress in January 2011. He was replaced by Norfolk County District Attorney Bill Keating. He is currently an attorney with the firm of Eckert Seamans Cherin & Mellott.

Early life, education, and early career
Born in Quincy, Massachusetts, Delahunt was educated at Thayer Academy, Middlebury College and Boston College Law School and later served as a radarman (RD3) in the United States Coast Guard Reserve. He served a term in the Massachusetts House of Representatives (1973–75) before serving as district attorney of Norfolk County for more than 20 years.

U.S. House of Representatives

Elections
In 1996, Democratic Congressman Gerry Studds decided to retire. Delahunt decided to run for Massachusetts's 10th congressional district. On September 17, 1996, Delahunt won the Democratic primary election with a plurality of 38% of the vote. He won the Plymouth County portion of the district, while losing the Norfolk County portion. He narrowly defeated state legislator Philip W Johnston of Marshfield by just 119 votes after a recount, which was conducted in a handful of contested towns. Following the recount, Delahunt sought judicial review in the Massachusetts Superior Court. 
After reviewing about 900 ballots, Judge Elizabeth B. Donovan declared Delahunt the victor. The case was appealed to the Massachusetts Supreme Judicial Court, which upheld the lower court ruling. The case is also noteworthy for the issue of "hanging chads" in punch-card voting machines. On November 5, 1996, Delahunt defeated Republican state Representative Edward B. Teague III 54%–42%.

He won re-election six times with at least 32 percentage points. His retirement was confirmed on March 4, 2010, by The Boston Globe. Shortly before the announcement of his retirement, it was discovered that Delahunt, while serving as district attorney for Norfolk County, Massachusetts, had refused to file charges against Amy Bishop for shooting and killing her brother in 1986. On February 12, 2010, Bishop murdered three of her colleagues at the University of Alabama in Huntsville after being denied tenure.

Tenure
As one of his first initiatives in Congress, he created the bipartisan caucus on the United States Coast Guard, which he co-chaired with two other Coast Guard veterans, Reps. Howard Coble (R-NC) and Gene Taylor (D-MS). This benefited his district through getting the problems of outpaced resources and security recognized at the ports of Massachusetts.

In November 2005, he met with Venezuelan President Hugo Chavez to arrange an assistance program in which Venezuela would supply winter home heating oil at a 40 percent price reduction to thousands of low-income Massachusetts residents. The program, which has since been expanded to help 500,000 people across the U.S., was carried out via the Venezuelan owned Citgo, and brought accusations that Delahunt was assisting an anti-American leader. Delahunt, however, has sometimes criticized Chavez, such as in a September 2006 letter expressing "profound disgust" at a speech given by Chavez to the United Nations, in which he personally attacked President George W. Bush. In the letter he urged that Chavez express disagreements "in a more constructive manner."

In the 110th Congress, Delahunt served as Chairman of the United States House Foreign Affairs Subcommittee on International Organizations, Human Rights, and Oversight.

He was a consistent opponent of the war in Iraq. However, on March 10, 2010, he voted against a measure to bring troops home from Afghanistan.

Committee assignments
 Committee on Foreign Affairs
 Subcommittee on Europe(Chairman 111th Congress)
 Subcommittee on International Organizations, Human Rights, and Oversight (Chairman 110th Congress)
 Committee on the Judiciary
 Subcommittee on Commercial and Administrative Law
 Subcommittee on Crime, Terrorism, and Homeland Security
 Task Force on Judicial Impeachment

Caucus memberships
 Co-chair of the bipartisan Coast Guard Caucus
 Co-chair of the House Older Americans Caucus
 Co-chair of the Congressional Working Group on Cuba

Delahunt was a member of the United States House Foreign Affairs Committee; Judiciary Committee; and also served as co-chair of the bipartisan Coast Guard Caucus, House Older Americans Caucus, and the Congressional Working Group on Cuba.

Post-congressional career

Lobbying
Upon Delahunt's retirement, he formed the Delahunt Group, a lobbying firm ("multi-service consulting firm focused on Government Affairs, International Market Entry Strategies, Corporate and Development Advisory, Federal and State Funding, and Appropriations, Regulatory and Permitting Assistance, Public Policy Strategies and Public Relations"). Delahunt told the Cape Cod Times that he viewed it as an extension of his work in Congress. As a legislator, he explained, he set policy at a macro level. Now, he said: "we're taking that and bringing it down here to the communities, to encourage implementation. We're working with the private sector and the public sector in a way that's a win-win for everyone." He told the Times he is particularly interested in work that encourages regional tourism and economic development."

Less than two months after leaving Congress, Delahunt lobbied on behalf of the Wampanoag people in Massachusetts to help them secure Indian gaming rights with the state legislature. Delahunt filled a gap left by the Wampanoag's previous lobbyist Jack Abramoff following his conviction associated with the renowned Jack Abramoff Indian lobbying scandal. Delahunt received over $15,000 in campaign contributions from the Wampanoag and Abramoff prior to leaving office sparking criticisms from good government advocates and casino opponents. While Delahunt is precluded by law from lobbying the Congress for at least one year, rules do not preclude him from lobbying state legislatures.

Delahunt formally announced his retirement from Congress in March 2010. Between March and December 2010, he made over $10,000 in campaign contributions to Massachusetts state legislators from his federal congressional PAC – a 500 percent increase from previous years' contributions.

Delahunt has also established a lobbying partnership with the Washington, DC-based Prime Policy Group on ways American companies can establish themselves in foreign countries while helping foreign businesses with connections to in United States markets. Prime Policy Group's clients include companies like Accenture, which have been criticized for moving offshore to avoid paying U.S. taxes. This partnership dovetails with Delahunt's work on behalf of the Wampanoag as their primary backers are the Malaysian gambling giant Genting Group. Genting is seeking to establish a foothold in the United States with ventures in New York, Miami and Massachusetts. The Wampanoag venture, if approved, would give Genting a tax-free foothold in Indian gaming in the United States.

Medical marijuana
Delahunt, the President of Medical Marijuana of Massachusetts Inc., has applied for three medical marijuana dispensary licenses from the Massachusetts state Department of Public Health. The businesses would be located in Mashpee, Plymouth and Taunton. The locations would all be in separate counties, so they will not compete with each other in the selection process.

Delahunt supports the creation of medical marijuana dispensaries to thwart the rise in prescription drug abuse. He will also be significantly involved in the operations of any of the dispensaries that Medical Marijuana of Massachusetts opens.

Harvard Institute of Politics
In late May 2017, Delahunt became the acting director of the Harvard Institute of Politics.

Diplomacy
In 2013, Delahunt helped free a U.S. citizen who was imprisoned by the Venezuelan government.

Personal life
Delahunt's paternal grandfather immigrated to the United States from Canada and his paternal grandmother's family was Irish.

He and his wife, Katharina E. Delahunt, divorced in 1986. They have one daughter, Kristin, and adopted another, Kara Mai (née Nguyen Mai Tai Trang), from Vietnam in 1975. While Congress was in session, Delahunt lived in a rented house with fellow Democratic politicians George Miller, Chuck Schumer, and Richard Durbin.

He is currently engaged to Julie Pagano.

References

External links

 
 Leader Pelosi's "30 Something" Working Group speeches

1941 births
Living people
American lobbyists
American people of Canadian descent
American people of Irish descent
Middlebury College alumni
Democratic Party members of the Massachusetts House of Representatives
District attorneys in Norfolk County, Massachusetts
United States Coast Guard enlisted
Politicians from Quincy, Massachusetts
Thayer Academy alumni
Boston College Law School alumni
Democratic Party members of the United States House of Representatives from Massachusetts
21st-century American politicians
United States Coast Guard reservists
Members of Congress who became lobbyists